Kerr Neilson (born 4 January 1950) is a South African-born Australian billionaire investment manager who, in 1994, co-founded Platinum Asset Management. Neilson's ability to consistently choose high-performing stocks has seen him dubbed "Australia's Warren Buffett". As of May 2022, his net worth was estimated at US$1.0 billion.

Early life
Kerr Neilson was born in Johannesburg, South Africa on 4 January 1950. Neilson first demonstrated an inclination for a future in investment management when he bought his first stock at the age of 13. In 1973, Neilson graduated with a Bachelor of Commerce from the University of Cape Town.

Career
Neilson worked in finance and investment management, most notably in the investment department of Cortaulds, London. After returning to South Africa in 1973, he moved to Australia ten years later as the head of retail funds management for Bankers Trust Australia.

Platinum Asset Management 
In 1994 Neilson co-founded Platinum Asset Management with the financial backing of George Soros. Neilson acted as managing director, executive director and chief investment officer. Founded as a specialist company in international equities, Platinum Asset Management manages an estimated 22 billion in funds in 2020. Platinum Asset Management continues to adopt Neilson's investment ideologies with a ‘contrarian, long term investing philosophy' that looks beyond short-term market turbulence to achieve strong long-term absolute returns. In 2018, Kerr Neilson stepped down as Chief Executive Officer and was replaced by Andrew Clifford. Neilson continues as chief investment officer for Platinum Master Portfolio and Platinum Japan Fund.

However, poor results during the 2012 financial year resulted in a 16 per cent fall in net profit, mainly due to a 14 per cent reduction in investment income. As a result, Neilsen agreed to forego a performance bonus, an increase in his base salary, and neither granted himself nor exercised options. As the principal shareholder of Platinum, Neilsen yielded A$42 million in dividends during the 2012 financial year.

Platinum originated as a specialist company in international equities and continues to operate globally in 2020, with a multibillion dollar portfolio. The success of the company is attributed to Neilson's ability to transcend short-term market investment and focus on long-term returns, an ideology that was developed over decades working in finance and investment management prior to 1994 and beyond.

This ideology was imbued into Platinum Asset Management with Neilson as chief executive officer and provided the company with an "ethos that has underpinned Platinum's approach to investing, product distribution, investor communications and every other aspect of our operations." This investment philosophy continued into Neilson's personal financials and investment decisions with uncanny success, as his decision to float Platinum shares at the time he did in 2007 made him a billionaire. Neilson floated his shares in Platinum Asset Management in 2007. The float produced strong financial returns for Neilson, with the majority (57%) of shares that Neilson retained valued at 2.9 billion. , Neilson is the chief investment officer for Platinum portfolios in Platinum Asset Management Ltd.

Personal life
Neilson and his former wife, Judith, divorced in 2015. They have two children.

Net worth
In 2007, Kerr Neilson floated 20% of Platinum Asset Management on the ASX. The majority of the shares Neilson retained (57%) were valued at 2.9 billion and made Neilson both a billionaire and one of Australia's wealthiest people. Forbes listed Neilson in their 2010 list of Australia's richest people with a net worth of 2.29 billion. Within the following couple of years however, unexpectedly low returns throughout the 2012 financial year resulted in a 16 per cent decrease in net profit. This fall being mainly attributed to a 14 per cent reduction in investment income. Subsequently Neilson cut performance bonuses and an increase in base salary.  As a result, Neilson yielded 42 million in dividends during the 2012 financial year. 

Neilson has continued to be listed in Forbes lists of Australia's 50 richest people and Australian billionaires from 2010 until the most recent publication of 2019. , Neilson was recorded as having a net worth of 1.2 billion, an 12 million or 1% increase since 5pm the previous day. According to the BRW, Neilson's net worth fell from 3.35 billion to 2 billion in 2015 as a result of his divorce, and to 1.95 billion in 2016.

Notes
: Prior to 2015, net worth was recorded in the name of Kerr Neilson only. From 2015, net worth was separated with individual listings for Kerr Neilson and for Judith Neilson.

References

External links
Platinum Asset Management website

Australian businesspeople
Australian billionaires
South African billionaires
South African emigrants to Australia
1950 births
Living people
People from Johannesburg